Edgar Alexander Melo Carrillo (born 19 October 1987) is a Chilean former footballer. His last club was Malleco Unido.

External links
 
 

1987 births
Living people
People from Arauco Province
People from Biobío Region
Chilean footballers
Chilean Primera División players
Primera B de Chile players
Segunda División Profesional de Chile players
C.D. Huachipato footballers
Deportes Valdivia footballers
Naval de Talcahuano footballers
Deportes Concepción (Chile) footballers
Puerto Montt footballers
Deportes Iberia footballers
Malleco Unido footballers
Association football midfielders